Tropical Storm Laura was a large but short-lived tropical cyclone that developed over the north-central Atlantic Ocean in late September during the 2008 Atlantic hurricane season. Laura's remnants later impacted the Netherlands, Germany, and Norway. Laura slowly developed tropical characteristics throughout the day as it moved over warmer waters. On the afternoon of September 30, Laura had acquired enough tropical characteristics to be designated a tropical storm. Shortly after being declared tropical, Laura began to undergo an extratropical transition, which did not fully take place until the morning of October 1. Laura degenerated into a post-tropical cyclone later that morning, and the final advisory by the National Hurricane Center was issued. The remnants of Laura contributed to heavy rainfall and power outages in the British Isles, the Netherlands, and Norway on October 5 to 8.

Meteorological history

On September 26, a very large extratropical area of low pressure developed along a quasi-stationary frontal system a few hundred miles west of the Azores. Over the following days, the low began to lose its frontal features and began to transition into a subtropical cyclone as it traveled in a general westward direction. By September 29, the low had developed sufficient convection and was declared Subtropical Storm Laura. Upon being upgraded, cold cloud tops began to wrap around the center of Laura and consolidate near the center of circulation. The convection organized around the center quickly and a satellite pass over the storm revealed that it could be intensifying. The overall structure of Laura remained subtropical but there were indications that it was acquiring tropical characteristics.

During the afternoon, satellites revealed that Laura had developed a deep warm core, a characteristic of a tropical cyclone, but the wind field remained subtropical in nature. However, Laura was still under the influence of an upper-level low and cloud tops remained shallow. However, the cloud tops became colder overnight and Laura was on the verge of becoming a tropical cyclone by the morning of September 30, but strong interaction with the upper-level low meant it was still subtropical. Despite moving over colder waters, a water vapor satellite image determined that Laura had separated itself from the upper-level low, signifying it had developed into a tropical cyclone. Not long after being declared tropical, early signs of an extratropical transition appeared. Cold air began to enter the storm on the west side and forecast models showed Laura becoming extratropical the next morning and non-tropical later the next day.

Overnight, convection associated with Laura began to diminish and lose tropical characteristics, but still retained its status. Early on October 1, the extratropical transition was fully apparent. Laura remained tropical but the cloud pattern was becoming frontal and there was little convection around the center of the system. With minimal shower and thunderstorm activity remaining around the center of Laura, the storm degenerated into a remnant-low pressure area on October 1 while still producing tropical storm-force winds. The next day, the remnant system transitioned into an extratropical cyclone and began to re-intensify as it rapidly tracked towards the north. After accelerating towards the east, another large extratropical cyclone absorbed the remnants of Laura while located several hundred miles west of the British Isles on October 4.

Impact

As a tropical cyclone, Laura never approached land, and no damages or fatalities occurred. Since the storm remained over open waters for most of its life, several ships and oil platforms recorded tropical storm-force winds. The highest recorded winds were at an oil platform with the call sign VEP717 at 03:00 UTC on October 1. Despite the lack of impact, the storm's remnants were caught in an upper-level jet stream, and steered towards Europe. There, they contributed to heavy rainfall across portions of Britain on October 5, causing localized accumulation of flood waters. As a result, Glebe Road near Windermere, England was closed in both directions, and along the A65 road between Old Hutton and Kirkby Lonsdale, previously saturated soil, combined with overwhelmed storm drains resulted in localized flooding. Traffic on the M6 Motorway was slowed due to poor driving conditions. One person had to be rescued from her car after driving into a flooded street. The UK Environment Agency issued 76 flood watches and 21 severe flood warnings as a result of the rainfall.

On October 8, the remnants of Laura reached the Netherlands. Consequently, streets and homes in the village of Hippolytushoef were reportedly inundated. The large amounts of precipitation broke the daily and monthly rainfall records for October, which were previously set in 2006. Gradually passing through Norway, the remnants of the storm caused significant damage to electric utilities. As a result, more than 10,000 people lost power in southern parts of the country.

See also

Other storms of the same name
 Timeline of the 2008 Atlantic hurricane season
 Tropical Storm Grace (2009)
 Tropical Storm Ernesto (2018)

References

External links
The NHC's Advisory Archive for Laura
The NHC's 

2008 Atlantic hurricane season
Laura 2008
Tropical Storm Laura
Laura